The English people in Paraguay mostly arrived during the colonial period as investors and industrialists. They were noted throughout the Southern cone region of Paraguay as being skilled farmers, investors, and bankers and as having created many of the regions railways and settled vast tracts of land. Especially in the region of Sapucái, Paraguarí Department, where it was the first place in Paraguay to have electricity and railways.

In the modern day however it is assumed most have become a part of the wider Paraguayan ethnicity, although there are still some in Paraguay who identify as "English".

The English indirectly and probably inadvertently played a major part in Paraguay's continual existence, because the British Empire had invested heavily throughout South America, including Paraguay.

The English had investments in the country through the British Empire, which they did not want to see affected by the disastrous Paraguayan War. Following the war, many politicians in Argentina proposed splitting the country between two of the victors, Brazil and Argentina. This would have seen Paraguay cease to exist as an independent state.

The English investors and the British Empire did not want to see their investments lost, and Brazil wanted to keep Paraguay as a sort of buffer state between it and Argentina, both of which had serious rivalries in the region. For those reasons, Paraguay was left in existence.

Today the English influence in Paraguay is not so far-reaching as it once was, and the English population in the country is a small minority, with many of the former English people of Paraguay becoming absorbed into the local population. Paraguay ranks relatively well at the EF English Proficiency Index (Top 50).

See also

Immigration to Paraguay

References

 
Immigration to Paraguay
English diaspora
European Paraguayan
Paraguay–United Kingdom relations